"Time Heals" is a song by American rapper Rod Wave, released on August 18, 2021 with an accompanying music video. It is the fourth single from his third studio album SoulFly (2021), appearing on the deluxe version. The song was produced by The Superiors & Co., MalikOTB, MarsGawd and DKeyz.

Composition
Over piano-laced production, Rod Wave laments on having several women around him to choose, but having trust issues due to his relationships in the past. Nevertheless, he indicates remaining resolute, confessing, "Don't need love, I need me time" and describing himself as "young, wild, and mad broken-hearted".

Music video
Directed by Yawn Rico and shot by Eye 4, the music video begins with Rod Wave riding around in the American countryside on four-wheelers. In the clip, he is seen performing across the country, in front of a private jet, getting a tattoo, and showing his new set of grills.

Charts

References

2021 singles
2021 songs
Rod Wave songs
Songs written by Rod Wave